John A. Bradley is an American television actor, who has also appeared in minor roles in blockbuster films such as Mars Attacks! and Independence Day.

Career 
His first big role was as Johnny Farrell in the 1998 television series, The Dirty Dozen, which aired on the Fox Network. He later played Mike Durning in the 1996 drama series L.A. Firefighters, and also played the main role in the third and fourth seasons of The New Adventures of Robin Hood.

He has also made appearances in several television shows, including Melrose Place, Baywatch, University Hospital, ER, The District, CSI: Miami, Desperate Housewives and others.

External links

The New Adventures of Robin Hood TV series fanpage

American male film actors
American male television actors
Living people
1960 births